The Jurors (Scotland) Act 1745 (19 Geo 2 c 9) was an Act of the Parliament of Great Britain, passed during the Jacobite Rising of 1745. Its long title was "An Act for the more easy and speedy Trial of such Persons as have levied, or shall levy War against His Majesty; and for the better ascertaining the Qualifications of Jurors in Trials for High Treason or Misprision of Treason, in that Part of Great Britain called Scotland." It was one of the Juries (Scotland) Acts 1745 to 1869.

It enacted that anyone who was prosecuted for high treason could be tried anywhere in England, regardless of where they had first been indicted. Under common law a trial had to take place in the county where the crime happened. The preamble to the Act explained that this change to the law was necessary because many prisoners had been moved to other prisons "for safer custody," or taken to London to be questioned, and it would have been inconvenient to transport them all back again. This exception to the rule had first been introduced as a temporary measure in 1715, during the first Jacobite Rising.

The Act also changed the criteria for jury service in trials for high treason and misprision of treason committed in Scotland.

It was repealed by section 2(1) of, and the Schedule to, the Treason Act 1945.

Other legislation

Another Act in the same year, 19 Geo.II c.26, stated that people named in the Act would automatically be attainted of treason unless they surrendered to the authorities by 12 July 1746.

See also
Habeas Corpus Suspension Act 1745
Sheriffs (Scotland) Act 1747
High treason in the United Kingdom
Treason Act

References

Treason in the United Kingdom
Great Britain Acts of Parliament 1745
Repealed Great Britain Acts of Parliament
Acts of the Parliament of Great Britain concerning Scotland
Jacobite rising of 1745
Scottish criminal law
Legal procedure